The Problem with Me is the second album by American indie rock band Seam. It was released in 1993 through Touch and Go Records.

Critical reception
Magnet wrote: "Nine blissfully hypnotic songs circled [Sooyoung] Park’s sadness and anger, building up tension and releasing it in a crash of restrained guitars and half-shouted vocals." Spin called the album "completely enveloping--a soft swirl of mood music with echoes of loneliness and confusion."

Legacy
Andrew Earles, in Gimme Indie Rock: 500 Essential American Underground Rock Albums 1981-1996, wrote that the album "would be hugely influential on the first wave of '90s emo bands and related practitioners of semi-popular indie rock" throughout the rest of the decade.

Track listing

Personnel 
Seam
Lexi Mitchell – bass guitar
Sooyoung Park – vocals, guitar
Bob Rising – drums
Craig White – guitar
Production and additional personnel
Bundy K. Brown – EBow on "Road to Madrid" and "Sweet Pea"
John McEntire – drums on "Road to Madrid"
Brad Wood – recording

References

External links 
 

1993 albums
Seam (band) albums
albums produced by Brad Wood
Touch and Go Records albums